Bukiyip (Bukiyúp), or Mountain Arapesh, is an Arapesh language (Torricelli) spoken by around 16,000 people between Yangoru and Maprik in the East Sepik Province of Papua New Guinea. Bukiyip follows the SVO typology. The Arapesh languages are known for their complex noun-phrase agreement system (Bukiyip has 18 of these noun classes).

Classification 
There are two primary dialects of Bukiyip Chamaun-Yabonuh and Ilipeim-Yamil (western) and two minor dialects Buki and Lohuhwim. Given significant variation among dialects, linguist Robert Conrad suggests that Bukiyip is likely part of dialect chain that also involves other Arapesh languages. The dialects may be further generalized as Coastal Arapesh and Mountain Bukiyip.

Phonology

Syllable structure
Syllabic stress is usually placed on the penultimate syllable, which has a higher pitch.

There are four contrastive intonation contours.

 Final Intonation - falling pitch on the last syllable, followed by a pause
 Non-final Intonation - level mid pitch on the last syllable, followed by a pause
 Interrogative Intonation - level mid/high pitch on the last word
 Imperative Intonation - high pitch and heavy stress throughout clause with a rapid pitch drop on the last syllable

Consonants 

written as: p, t, k, b, d, g, s, ch, j, h, m, n, ny, l, r, w, y

Vowels 
Initial vowels clusters: ou, au, ai, ia

Medial vowel clusters: e (a,o,i,u), a (u,e,i), i (é,a,e), o (u,i), uu, úo

Final vowel clusters: eo, ou, uu

written as: i, e, a, o, u, æ, é, ú

Morphophonemics
Bukiyip has 18 basic rules for morphophonemic shifts (rules 8-18 primarily apply to the Chamaun-Yabonuh and Buki dialects).

 VcCalv → VfCalv                                          (e.g. p-a-chuh → )
 w + ú → u,   ú + w → uw,   i + ú → i           (e.g. i-ú-nak → inak)
 ny + u → nyú                                              (e.g. bolany+umu → bolanyumu)
 ú + CrVr → uCrVr,   eCrVr → oCrVr            (e.g. p-ú-hok → )
 a + CVc → éCVc                                        (e.g. n-a-bah →nébah)
 Vc + C + w → VrCw,   where Vc is not a,    (e.g. ny-ú-hwech → nyuhwech)
 Cw + Vr → CVr                                           (e.g.  →)
 i# + i → i                                                     (e.g. i-ú-tak → itak)
 #w + é → #wo                                            (e.g. kw-é-nak → konak)
 m# + ú → mu                                             (e.g.  m-ú-bo → mubo)
 #Vc +tVr → otVr                                         (e.g. atúwe → otuwe)
 e# + úk → eik                                            (e.g. +-úk → )
 C# + CVc → CVcCVc                                 (e.g. chagas + búk → )
 ú + C# + u → uCu                                      (e.g. u-túl-úgún+-u → )
 ú# + C + u# → oCu#                                  (e.g. natalú → )
 VrCr# + ú → VrCru                                      (e.g. +-úk →)
 u# + ú → uwu                                             (e.g. natu + -uk → )
 ú# + u → o                                                  (e.g. yekinú+umu → )

The above rules use the following abbreviations:

Vr - rounded vowels

Vc - central unrounded vowels

Vu - unrounded vowels

Vf - front vowels

C - consonant

Calv - alveopalatal consonants

Cr - rounded consonants

# - morpheme boundary in phonological word

Words

Nouns
There are 18 noun classes with a closed set of suffixes of the form: noun nucleus + number (-unú).

V1 is the first vowel in a medial vowel cluster, V2 is the second vowel in a medial vowel cluster.

Pronouns and demonstratives
Pronouns and demonstratives must agree with the noun class and have singular and plural forms, pronouns also encode proximal and distal information.

Possessive pronouns have the form: pronoun + -i + unú (noun number class)

Verbs

Verb structure 
Verbs have a complex structure of affixes encoding mood, object, benefactive, and direction which either have their own classes or must agree with the noun class. The structure is:

Subject (n-) + Mood (u- 'irrealis', a- 'realis') + Object (unú-) + Verb Nucleus (verb root 1–6, verb stem 1-2)+ Object 2 (-unú) + Benefactive (-m 'benefactive' +  or -ag 'here') + Directional (-u 'displaced', -i 'toward speaker', '-uk' permanent).

Object 2 and Benefactive may not occur in all verbs.

Verb subject prefixes

Mood marker 
All verbs (with the exception of class 6 have a mood marker). The realis mood (mood marker 'a-') concerns events that have happened in the past and present. The irrealis mood (mood marker 'u-') concerns future events and events that did not happen in the past (such as in the case of a mistaken memory). The imperative mood (used for commands) and interrogative mood (used for questions) are formed by clausal transformations.

Verb object suffixes

Verb root classes 

Class 8 has a second object while class 4 only has one.

Adjectives
Adjectives consist of a root word followed by the appropriate noun-class suffix (see the noun class table).

Adverbs
There are three adverb classes in Bukiyip: '' (all) in the irrealis mood and '-nubu' (completely) and '-gamu' (well) in the realis mood. All adverbs are inflected, and may have free or bound stems depending on which modifier slot they are placed in the clausal, phrase, or sentence syntax.

Counting system
There are two basic numeral roots 'atú-' (one) and 'bia-' (two). These numeral prefixes are added to noun root words and then undergo a morphological process (see the Morphophonemics section) that combines them. For example:

atú   +   -p   +   utom    →    atum    →    otum

or

bia   +   -ch   +       →    

The numeral root '' (four) is an exception to this assimilation pattern. In addition to the atú- and bia- numeral roots, there is also a stem éné- meaning one, an, or some depending on context.

Phrases
There are 23 phrase formations in Bukiyip.

Verb phrases 
1. Modified Verb Phrase: Modifier (class 1-2 adverb) + Head (verb class 1-7) + Modifier (class 3 adverb, adverb phrase)

2. Repeated Verb Phrase: Head (verb class 10, motion verb) + Modifier (class 3 adverb) + Head (verb class 10, '-lto') + Modifier

3. Coordinate Verb Phrase: Head (verb class 1–5, coordinate phrase) + Head (verb class 1–5, modified phrase) + Modifier

4. Motion Verb Phrase: Head (motion verb, motion verb phrase) + Head (verb class 3, coordinate verb phrase) + Modifier (adverb class 3)

Noun phrases 
5. Modified Noun Phrase 1: Modifier (demonstrative, numeral phrase, quantitative stem) + Modifier (class 2 adjective, adjective phrase, nominalised clause, limiter phrase) + Possessive (possessive phrase, possessive pronoun) + Head (class 1-15 noun, coordinate noun phrase)

6. Modified Noun Phrase 2: Modifier (noun stem, class 17-18 noun, class 3 locative phrase) + Head (noun)

7. Apposition Noun Phrase: Head (apposition noun phrase, coordinate noun phrase, demonstrative, intensive phrase, class 18 noun, pronoun, temporal stem) + Apposition (clause, nominalised clause, coordinate noun phrase, modified noun phrase, class 17-18 noun, derived noun stem, pronoun, temporal stem) + Identification (pronoun)

8. Coordinate Noun Phrase: Head (apposition noun phrase, modified noun phrase, class 17 noun, pronoun) + Head (apposition noun phrase, modified noun phrase, class 17 noun, pronoun) + Coordinate ('o', 'úli',  + a- + -nú,  + ú- + -nú)

Modified noun phrases 
9. Possessive Phrase: Head (apposition noun phrase, coordinate noun phrase, demonstrative, class 3 locative phrase, modified noun phrase, class 17-18 noun, noun stem) + Possessive (personal pronoun, '-i-')

10. Limiter Phrase: Head (adverb, demonstrative, modified noun phrase, noun stem, pronoun) + Limiter (at- + <únú>, ati)

11. Intensive Phrase: Head (pronoun) + Intensifier ('kénak', 'meho')

12. Instrumental-Benefactor Phrase: Benefactive (umu) + Head (intransitive clause, transitive clause, modified noun phrase)

13. Similarity Phrase: Similarity ('(') + Head (intransitive clause, transitive clause, demonstrative, pronoun, modified noun phrase) + Similarity ('-umu')

14. Accompaniment Phrase: Head (pronoun, modified noun phrase, apposition noun phrase) + Accompaniment ('')

Locative phrase 
15. Locative Phrase 1: Locative (locative) + Head (locative clause, locative word, class 2-3 locative phrase 2, modified noun phrase, class 18 noun) + Identifier (class 18 noun)

16. Locative Phrase 2: Head (intransitive clause, transitive clause, locative, noun, pronoun) + Locative ('-umu', '-ahah')

17. Locative Phrase 3: Head (class 2 locative) + Head (class 3 locative)

Temporal phrase 
18. Temporal Phrase 1: Head (temporal stem) + Temporal ('-abali')

19. Temporal Phrase 2: Modifier ('húlúkati-mu) + Head (temporal word)

20. Serial Temporal Phrase: Head (temporal word) + Head (temporal word)

Numeral phrase 
21. Numeral Phrase: Head (modified noun phrase, numeral stem) + Head (numeral stem) + Head (numeral stem)

Interrogative phrase 
22. Interrogative Phrase: Modifier (interrogative word) + Head (class 1-14 noun)

Adjective/adverb phrase 
23. Adjective Phrase: Head (adjective stem) + Head (adjective stem) 1-14 noun

References

Arapesh languages
Languages of Sandaun Province
Languages of East Sepik Province
Vulnerable languages